Kõivsaare  is a village in Võru Parish, Võru County in southeastern Estonia.

References

 

Villages in Võru County